These are lists of Bundesliga managers who have taken charge of the most matches or have won a title in this league, which is the top level of the German football league system and started in 1963.

Most Bundesliga games managed
 First / Last = year of first / last Bundesliga game managed
 Seasons (Sea): number of Bundesliga seasons managed
Managers are sorted by number of games, then by year of first game.  Current Bundesliga managers and their current clubs are shown in bold.

Most Bundesliga games managed by club 
Current Bundesliga managers who hold the record for the club are shown in bold.

Bundesliga title-winning managers

See also
Bundesliga records and statistics
List of DFB-Pokal winning managers

References 

 
Bundesliga managers